From 2009 to 2018, Luca Segantini was executive director of the International Society of Nephrology, a global organization providing tailored kidney education and to bridge gaps in access to ethical and equitable kidney care.

As part of the ISN mission, Segantini was a member of the World Kidney Day Steering Committee. World Kidney Day is a global campaign to raise awareness about kidney health.  Since 2012, Segantini was also managing director of World Kidney Fund, a Belgian private foundation engaged in fundraising to improve kidney care worldwide by supporting the International Society of Nephrology's philanthropic programs.

From March 2019 to January 2022, Luca Segantini was Chief Executive Officer of the European Society for Organ Transplantation - ESOT, a not-for-profit organization incorporated in The Netherlands. ESOT is the umbrella organisation under which all European transplant activities are organised. ESOT cooperates with many other organisations to structure and streamline transplant activities in Europe.{{multiple issues|

Starting from April 2022, Luca and his company Blue Highways are available to consult on non-profit management, new media and communications.

References

External links
European Society for Organ Transplantation
The International Society of Nephrology website
World Kidney Day website
World Kidney Fund website

Living people
Year of birth missing (living people)